Tokmany is a rural locality (a village) in Asovskoye Rural Settlement, Beryozovsky District, Perm Krai, Russia. The population was 2 as of 2010. There are 3 streets.

Geography 
Tokmany is located on the Barda River, 32 km southeast of  Beryozovka (the district's administrative centre) by road. Yepishata is the nearest rural locality.

References 

Rural localities in Beryozovsky District, Perm Krai